Michael Francis Smrek (born 31 August 1962) is a Canadian former professional basketball player. He was selected in the second round of the 1985 NBA draft by the Portland Trail Blazers, and played seven seasons in the league as a backup  center. He won two NBA championships with the Los Angeles Lakers.

Early life 
Smrek graduated from Eastdale High School in Welland, Ontario, having grown up in Port Robinson, Ontario, and a nearby rural farming community. He worked on his family farm and had little time for organized sports. He did not start playing basketball until grade 10 after being prodded by the high school coach to try out. "He was a nice guy, so I didn't want to hurt his feelings," Smrek said.

College career
At Canisius College, Smrek averaged 9.1 points, 5.2 rebounds, 1.6 blocks, and 0.8 assists in 23 minutes a contest over four years. He is the college's second-leading career shot-blocker with 172 (compatriot Michael Meeks is first with 183). He also had the two best seasons for field-goal percentage in school history with a .632 FGP in 1983-84 and a .601 FGP in 1984–85.

Professional career
Smrek was a back-up center, appearing in 194 games over seven seasons. He averaged 9.7 minutes, 2.9 points, 2.2 rebounds, and 0.8 blocks a contest during this time. Drafted by the Portland Trail Blazers with the first pick in the second round of the 1985 NBA draft out of Canisius College, he played as a rookie with future star Michael Jordan and the Chicago Bulls, appearing in 38 games and averaged around his career totals.

The NBA defending-champion Boston Celtics were interested in signing Smrek, but he chose the Los Angeles Lakers instead. He figured the Lakers provided him the best opportunity for a regular role in the NBA, as their starting center, Kareem Abdul-Jabbar, was approaching age 40. Smrek played sparingly in his two seasons with the Lakers, but earned NBA championship rings in 1987 and 1988. The first title was against the rival Celtics in six games. He then had a year with the San Antonio Spurs, parts of three seasons with the Golden State Warriors and a brief stint with the Los Angeles Clippers. He also played for the Toronto Raptors in the 1996 preseason.

He played in Italy for Fulgor Libertas Forlì (1989–90), in the Greek League for Dafni BC (1992–93) and in Croatia for KK Split (1996–97).

Personal life
Smrek and his wife have two children, one son and one daughter. His son Luke played tennis at Marquette University, while his daughter Anna currently plays volleyball at the University of Wisconsin. As a freshman in 2021, Anna was named Most Outstanding Player of the NCAA Final Four as the Badgers claimed their first-ever national title in the sport.

References 

1962 births
Living people
Basketball people from Ontario
Canadian expatriate basketball people in Croatia
Canadian expatriate basketball people in Greece
Canadian expatriate basketball people in Italy
Canadian expatriate basketball people in the United States
Canadian men's basketball players
Canisius Golden Griffins men's basketball players
Centers (basketball)
Chicago Bulls players
Dafnis B.C. players
Golden State Warriors players
Greek Basket League players
KK Split players
Los Angeles Clippers players
Los Angeles Lakers players
National Basketball Association players from Canada
Portland Trail Blazers draft picks
San Antonio Spurs players
Sportspeople from Welland
1994 FIBA World Championship players